Brookfield Township is a civil township of Huron County in the U.S. state of Michigan.  As of the 2000 census, the township population was 914.

History
Broofield Township was organized in 1868.

Communities
 The Village of Owendale is within the Township.
 Bach is an unincorporated community on the Township's border with Sebewaing Township at Bach and Bay Port Roads  with side streets (Liken and Bartholomy) in Sebewaing.
 Creel was a rural post office in the township from 1886 until 1889.
 Crew was the name of a rural post office in the township from 1904 until 1907.
 Linkville is an unincorporated community on the Township's border with Winsor Township on Kilmanagh Road between Caseville and Notter Road . with the community's Linkville Cemetery on Stein Road between Caseville and Notter Road in Winsor Township.

Geography

Demographics
As of the census of 2000, there were 914 people, 329 households, and 226 families residing in the township.  The population density was 25.7 per square mile (9.9/km2).  There were 369 housing units at an average density of 10.4 per square mile (4.0/km2).  The racial makeup of the township was 98.91% White, 0.22% Asian, and 0.88% from two or more races. Hispanic or Latino of any race were 6.24% of the population.

There were 329 households, out of which 31.0% had children under the age of 18 living with them, 57.1% were married couples living together, 7.3% had a female householder with no husband present, and 31.3% were non-families. 24.3% of all households were made up of individuals, and 15.8% had someone living alone who was 65 years of age or older.  The average household size was 2.53 and the average family size was 3.04.

In the township the population was spread out, with 25.1% under the age of 18, 9.1% from 18 to 24, 25.5% from 25 to 44, 22.5% from 45 to 64, and 17.8% who were 65 years of age or older.  The median age was 39 years. For every 100 females, there were 100.0 males.  For every 100 females age 18 and over, there were 92.4 males.

The median income for a household in the township was $32,656, and the median income for a family was $39,167. Males had a median income of $29,922 versus $19,297 for females. The per capita income for the township was $14,737.  About 5.6% of families and 14.3% of the population were below the poverty line, including 9.5% of those under age 18 and 7.2% of those age 65 or over.

References

Townships in Huron County, Michigan
1868 establishments in Michigan
Townships in Michigan